British Forces Gibraltar is the British Armed Forces stationed in the British overseas territory of Gibraltar. Gibraltar is used primarily as a training area, thanks to its good climate and rocky terrain, and as a stopover for aircraft and ships en route to and from deployments East of Suez or in Africa.

History 

British Armed Forces in Gibraltar had been predominantly naval-led since the 1890s. In the 1950s discussions about the creation of NATO's Allied Forces Mediterranean led to the Flag Officer Gibraltar being placed in command of NATO forces in the area.

However, many years later, the British Royal Navy captain serving as Head of Sea Section in Operations Division, SHAPE, was to have to deal with the re-absorption of Spain into NATO in the early 1990s. Arranging the NATO-Spain-Gibraltar-UK linkages involved "delicate negotiations," but British plans, to Captain Peter Melson's knowledge "committed no forces to defence of the Strait, while Spain was willing to commit substantial elements of their ORBAT [order of battle, their armed forces]."

The last UK based army battalion, 3rd Battalion Royal Green Jackets, left Gibraltar in 1991 and the Royal Gibraltar Regiment took charge of local defence under the new headquarters British Forces Gibraltar.

HM Dockyard, Gibraltar
HM Dockyard, Gibraltar was active from 1895 to 1984. The dockyard was used extensively by the Royal Navy, docking many of the Navy's most prestigious ships. In the early 1980s a decision by the United Kingdom's Ministry of Defence to cut back the Royal Navy surface fleet meant that the dockyard was no longer financially viable.

In 1984 the dockyard passed into the hands of the UK ship repair and conversion company, A&P Group. A government grant and a prospect of lucrative Royal Fleet Auxiliary refit contracts did not help A&P Group however and they passed the yard into the hands of the Government of Gibraltar.

The current dockyard is still used by the Royal Navy and is referred to as 'His Majesty's Naval Base Gibraltar (HMNB Gibraltar)'.

Permanent units 
Though Gibraltar's current garrison is much smaller than it had been before the end of the Cold War, a sizable force still exists, including:

Ministry of Defence

 Armaments Depot, Gibraltar,  Defence Equipment and Support
 Kings lines oil fuel depot,  Oil and Pipelines Agency

Army

 Royal Gibraltar Regiment (Hybrid), at Devil's Tower Camp (Mixed infantry-focused unit)
Buffadero Training Centre

Navy

 Windmill Hill Signal Station
 His Majesty's Naval Base, Gibraltar
 Gibraltar Squadron, at His Majesty's Naval Base, Gibraltar
 River-class offshore patrol vessel:  – permanently deployed at Gibraltar since April 2021
 Cutlass-class patrol vessels (replaced previous Archer-class boats 2021/22):
 HMS Cutlass (arrived in Gibraltar, November 2021)
  (arrived in Gibraltar, March 2022)
 x3 Pacific 24 Rigid-hulled inflatable boats
 x1 Vahana-class 15m diving support boat

Air Force
 RAF Gibraltar, the Royal Air Force's military aerodrome in Gibraltar, also doubles up as the territory's civilian airport.

Flag officer commanding

Senior Officer, Gibraltar
Post holders included:
 Captain Claude E. Buckle: August 1889 – February 1892
 Captain Atwell P.M. Lake: February 1892 – January 1895 
 Captain James A.T. Bruce: January 1895 – January 1898 
 Captain Charles C. Drury: January 1898 – September 1899 
 Captain William H. Pigott: September 1899 – October 1902 (later V.Adm Sir William Harvey Pigott)

Flag Officer, Gibraltar
Post holders included:
 Vice-Admiral Sir William A. Dyke Acland, Bt.: October 1902 – July 1904 
 Rear-Admiral Sir Edward Chichester, Bt.: July 1904 – September 1906 
 Rear-Admiral Sir James E.C. Goodrich: September 1906 – September 1909 
 Vice-Admiral Frederick S. Pelham: September 1909 – October 1912 
 Vice-Admiral Frederic E.E.Brock: October 1912 – October 1915
 Rear-Admiral Bernard Currey: October 1915 – July 1917 (and as Senior Naval Officer and in charge of all Naval Establishments, Gibraltar)
 Rear-Admiral Sir Heathcoat S.Grant: July 1917 – July 1919 
 Rear-Admiral Sir Reginald Y.Tyrwhitt, Bt.: July 1919 – January 1921 
 Rear-Admiral Henry B.Pelly: January 1921 – January 1923 (also Admiral Superintendent, Gibraltar Yard)
 Rear-Admiral Walter M. Ellerton: January 1923 – April 1925 
 Rear-Admiral Richard G.A.W.Stapleton-Cotton: April 1925 – April 1927 (also Admiral Superintendent of H.M. Dockyard, Gibraltar)
 Rear-Admiral Cyril S. Townsend: April 1927 – April 1929 (also Admiral Superintendent of H.M. Dockyard, Gibraltar)
 Rear-Admiral Berwick Curtis: April 1929 – April 1931 
 Rear-Admiral Thomas N. James: April 1931 – May 1933 
 Rear-Admiral Francis M. Austin: May 1933 – May 1935 
 Vice-Admiral Sir James M. Pipon: May 1935 – May 1937 
 Rear-Admiral Alfred E. Evans: May 1937 – May 1939, as Rear Admiral-in-Charge, and Admiral-Superintendent HM Dockyard Gibraltar

Flag Officer, Gibraltar and North Atlantic

 Rear-Admiral Norman A. Wodehouse: May–November 1939 
 Admiral Sir Dudley B. N. North: November 1939 – December 1940 
 Vice-Admiral Sir G. Frederick B. Edward-Collins: December 1940 – December 1942

Flag Officer, Gibraltar and Mediterranean Approaches
Post holders included:
 Vice-Admiral Sir Frederick Edward Collins : December 1942 - January 1943
 Admiral Sir Frederick Edward Collins : January 1943 - August 1943
 Vice-Admiral Sir Harold M. Burrough: September 1943 – January 1945 
 Vice-Admiral Sir Victor A.C. Crutchley: January 1945 – December 1946

Flag Officer, Gibraltar
Post holders included:
 Vice-Admiral Ernest R. Archer: December 1946 – June 1948 
 Vice-Admiral Patrick W.B. Brooking: June 1948 – June 1950 
 Vice-Admiral Lord Ashbourne: June 1950 – May 1952 
 Rear-Admiral St. John A. Micklethwait: May 1952 – October 1953 
 Rear-Admiral Harry P. Currey: October 1953 – May 1956 
 Rear-Admiral Roy S. Foster-Brown: May 1956 – February 1959 
 Rear-Admiral Philip F. Powlett: February 1959 – March 1962 
 Rear-Admiral Erroll N. Sinclair: March 1962 – July 1964 
 Rear-Admiral Thomas W. Best: July 1964 – November 1966 
 Rear-Admiral Michael F. Fell: November 1966 – April 1968 
 Rear-Admiral Ian W. Jamieson: April 1968 – October 1969  
 Rear-Admiral A. Rodney B. Sturdee: October 1969 – January 1972 
 Rear-Admiral Hubert W.E. Hollins: January 1972 – May 1974  
 Rear-Admiral Sefton R. Sandford: May 1974 – September 1976 
 Rear-Admiral Michael L. Stacey: September 1976 – January 1979 
 Rear-Admiral Gwynedd Pritchard: January 1979 – January 1981 
 Rear-Admiral D. John Mackenzie:  January 1981 – January 1983 
 Rear-Admiral George Vallings: January 1983 – March 1985 
 Rear-Admiral Peter G.V. Dingemans: March 1985 – September 1987
 Rear-Admiral the Hon. Nicholas J. Hill-Norton: September 1987 – January 1990 
 Rear-Admiral Geoffrey Biggs (January 1990 – April 1992)

Commander British Forces, Gibraltar

Post holders included:
Rear Admiral Jeremy Sanders (April 1992 – December 1994) 
Major-General Simon Pack (December 1994 – April 1997)
Commodore Alastair Taylor (April 1997 – June 1999)
Commodore Andrew Willmett (June 1999 – December 2001)
Commodore Richard Clapp (December 2001 – May 2004)
Commodore David White (May 2004 – 8 January 2005)
Commodore Allan Adair (19 January 2005 – 1 May 2007)
Commodore Matt Parr (1 May 2007 – February 2009)
Commodore Adrian Bell (February 2009 – September 2010)
Commodore Tom Karsten (September 2010 – November 2012)
Commodore John Clink (November 2012 – August 2014)
Commodore Ian McGhie (August 2014 – July 2016)
Commodore Mike Walliker (July 2016 – September 2018)
Commodore Timothy Henry (September 2018 – July 2020)
Commodore Steve Dainton (July 2020 – present)

See also
 List of British Army installations

Notes

External links
British Forces Gibraltar Community Site
British Army – Gibraltar
RAF Gibraltar

 
Joint commands of the United Kingdom